Tenang Stesen (Jawi: تنڠ ستيسين), commonly known as “Tenang”, is a small town in Segamat District, Johor, Malaysia. The town is located between Genuang and Labis. Pekan Air Panas is located in the same district also named as Tenang.

Transportation
 Tenang railway station (abandoned)

References

Towns in Johor
Segamat District